Maharajalela Monorail station is a Malaysian elevated monorail train station that forms a part of the Kuala Lumpur Monorail (KL Monorail) line located in Kuala Lumpur and opened alongside the rest of the train service on 31 August 2003.

The Maharajalela station is named after and was constructed over the southeast-bound lane of Jalan Maharajalela (Malay; English: Maharajalela Road), just southwest from Stadium Merdeka (Independence Stadium) and several hundred metres south from old Kuala Lumpur, including Petaling Street (several stations along the Kelana Jaya Line and Ampang Line, however, are significantly closer to or are within the area). The station is located along a stretch of monorail tracks laid along Jalan Maharajalela, between the track's turnoff into Jalan Imbi (Imbi Road), and another turnoff into Jalan Sultan Sulaiman (Sultan Sulaiman Road). This station was formerly called Merdeka Monorail station.

Layout

Exits and Entrances
The station has three exits, with two leading to either side of Jalan Maharajalela at the northern and southern points, and one at the northeast side of the station leading into a car park of Stadium Merdeka.

References

Kuala Lumpur Monorail stations
Railway stations opened in 2003